Molecular Diversity is a quarterly peer-reviewed scientific journal published by Springer Science+Business Media covering research on molecular diversity and combinatorial chemistry in basic and applied research and drug discovery. The journal publishes both short and full-length papers, perspectives, news, and reviews. Coverage addresses the generation of molecular diversity, application of diversity for screening against alternative targets of all types, and the analysis of results and their applications. The journal was established in 1995 and the editors-in-chief are Hong-yu Li and Kunal Roy.

History 
The journal ceased publication at the end of 2000, but was revived when starting in 2003 it absorbed Molecular Diversity Preservation International's Journal of Molecular Diversity. Shu-Kun Lin served as editor-in-chief and edited volumes 6-11 (2003-2007). He was succeeded by Guillermo A. Morales, who has been editor-in-chief until June 2018.

Abstracting and indexing 
The journal is abstracted and indexed in:

According to the Journal Citation Reports, the journal has a 2020 impact factor of 2.943.

References

External links 
 
Molecular diversity: at a crossroads. Molecular Diversity, August 2018, Volume 22, Issue 3, pp 543–543. https://link.springer.com/article/10.1007/s11030-018-9858-8 

English-language journals
Publications established in 1995
Pharmacology journals
Springer Science+Business Media academic journals
Quarterly journals
Combinatorial chemistry